Harmony Grove Cemetery is a rural cemetery in Salem, Massachusetts.   It was established in 1840 and is located at 30 Grove Street.  The cemetery is approximately 35 acres in size and was designed by Francis Peabody and Alexander Wadsworth.

The cemetery includes the Gothic revival Blake Memorial Chapel of 1905.

Notable burials
James Armstrong (1794–1868), American Commodore
 Frank Weston Benson (1862–1951), American Impressionist artist
 John Prentiss Benson (1865–1947), Maritime paintings artist
 William Bentley (1759–1819), Unitarian minister and diarist
 Captain John Bertram (1796–1882) Founder of Salem Hospital .  When John Bertram died in March 1882, his widow donated their home, John Bertram Mansion, a High Style Italianate brick and brownstone mansion that was built at 370 Essex Street  and this became the Salem Public Library.  In addition,  John Bertram House is now a home for the elderly.
 William Cogswell (1838–1895), US Civil War general
 Jacob Crowninshield (1770–1808), Representative from Massachusetts
 Theodore Frelinghuysen Dwight (1846–1917), American librarian and archivist, and American diplomat to Switzerland.
 Luis F. Emilio (1844–1918), Member of Whipple's Jewels
 Caroline Emmerton (1866–1942), Founder of the Settlement at the House of Seven Gables
 William Crowninshield Endicott (1826–1900), US Secretary of War
 Maxim Karolik (1898–1964), Art collector and donor
Photius Fisk (1809-1890) abolitionist and U.S. Navy Chaplain abolished flogging in U.S. Navy  
 James Miller (1776–1851), War of 1812 general and first governor of Arkansas Territory
 Edward Sylvester Morse (1838–1925), American naturalist
 George Swinnerton Parker (1866–1952), Founder of Parker Brothers
 George Peabody (1795–1869), American businessman/philanthropist
 Joseph Peabody (1757-1844), American merchant
 Dudley Leavitt Pickman (1779–1846), American businessman/philanthropist
 William Frederick Poole (1821–1894), American bibliographer
 Charles Lenox Remond (1810–1873), American orator and abolitionist (brother of Sarah, see below)
 Leverett Saltonstall I (1783–1845), 1st Mayor of Salem, MA
 Thomas Treadwell Stone (1801–1895), Transcendentalist, Abolitionist

Monuments
There are several monuments in Harmony Grove. 
Cannons given to the cemetery by the War Department in 1888. These were outmoded soon after the Civil War.
 Monument for the family of Sarah Parker Remond (1826–1894), an American physician and abolitionist who was sister of Charles. Sarah was buried in Rome.  Her father was John Remond.
 Monument for Frederick Townsend Ward (1831–1862), an American mercenary, who was cremated and buried in China.
 Monument for Stephen C. Phillips (1801–1857), Representative from Massachusetts

Old burial ground
An old burial ground, called Gardner Hill, was situated a little west of Harmony Grove. When the area of Boston Street and Grove was developed in the 1840s, one hundred fifty gravestones were moved from Gardner Hill to the cemetery. One of these was that of Thomas Gardner (1592–1674) who came to the area, from Cape Ann, with Roger Conant in 1626. The stones of Thomas' daughter, Seeth, and grandson, Abel, were also moved to Harmony Grove.

One of the stones moved from the old burial ground was for Robert Buffum who arrived in 1634, from Yoshire, England, and was buried in 1669. His is the oldest grave (stones - his remains are not there) in Harmony Grove.

Sources

 Harmony Grove Cemetery (Salem, Mass.: Whipple and Smith, 1866)
 Harmony Grove Cemetery (Salem, Mass) - brochure (2010)

References

Cemeteries in Salem, Massachusetts
Tourist attractions in Salem, Massachusetts
1840 establishments in Massachusetts
Rural cemeteries
Cemeteries established in the 1840s